Moselle Iron Furnace Stack is a historic iron furnace stack located near Moselle, Franklin County, Missouri. It was built in 1848-1849 by the Moselle Iron Furnace (1850-1854), and later operated as the Furnace of the Franklin Iron Mining Co. (1855-1859), and Moselle Iron Company (1874-1875).  It is 31 feet high and constructed of cut stone blocks.  The furnace was closed in early June 1875.

It was listed on the National Register of Historic Places in 1969.

References

Ironworks and steel mills in the United States
Industrial buildings and structures on the National Register of Historic Places in Missouri
Industrial buildings completed in 1849
Buildings and structures in Franklin County, Missouri
National Register of Historic Places in Franklin County, Missouri
Industrial furnaces